Nehodiv is a municipality and village in Klatovy District in the Plzeň Region of the Czech Republic. It has about 70 inhabitants.

Geography
It lies in the Blatná Uplands. In the western part of the territory is located the Dolejší dráhy Nature Monument.

History
The first written mention of Nehodiv is from 1558.

Demographics

Economy
Nehodiv is known for a marble quarry. In 2015, the extraction was renewed.

Sights
There is the Chapel of Saint John of Nepomuk in the centre of the village. It was built in 1950.

Gallery

References

External links

Villages in Klatovy District